Štefan Jačiansky (June 6, 1930 – October 3, 1995) was a Slovak football manager.

Career
Born in Nădlac, Romania, Jačiansky played football for ŠK Slávia Bratislava.

He coached ŠK Slovan Bratislava, Dynamo Žilina, Tatran Prešov, VSS Košice and ZTS Martin.

References 

Czechoslovak footballers
Slovak football managers
ŠK Slovan Bratislava managers
FC VSS Košice managers
MŠK Žilina managers
1930 births
1995 deaths
1. FC Tatran Prešov managers
FC DAC 1904 Dunajská Streda managers
People from Nădlac
Association footballers not categorized by position